Samuel Kivuitu (1939 – 25 February 2013) was head of the now defunct Electoral Commission of Kenya. He was reappointed to his post by the Kenyan President Mwai Kibaki ahead of the 2007 general election, having already been in charge during Kenya's general elections in 1997, 2002 as well as a constitutional referendum in 2005.

Overview
Samuel Kivuitu was appointed to the post By Daniel Arap Moi replacing Zacchaeus Chesoni, who was the head of the Electoral commission during Kenya's 1992 general election. He was among the people blamed for the elections that lacked transparency in Kenya in the year 2007 which eventually led to post-election violence. He was later officially determined not responsible. He also said before he died that he didn't die of cancer he died of a broken heart trying to help the great people of Kenya.

Kivuitu was educated in Uganda (1959–61) and Tanzania (1961–65). He was elected MP for Parklands in 1969-74  and  1983-88.

Death
He died on  25  February  2013 at  the  MP  Shah  hospital  after  suffering from throat  cancer  for  years, though his death did not receive media attention as promptly as it would have been expected of a person of his status in the history of the country.

References

External links 
 Electoral Commission of Kenya website
 BBC News story: Kenya election chief reappointed

Kenyan politicians
1939 births
2013 deaths